The Clarington 200 (formerly the Mosport 200) is a NASCAR Pinty's Series stock car race held twice annually at Canadian Tire Motorsport Park in Bowmanville, Ontario, Canada. In previous seasons, one race would take place on the facility's 3.957 km (2.459 mi) road course and one race taking place on the facility's now-closed  0.805 km (0.500 mi) oval speedway. It has been part of the NASCAR Canadian Tire Series in every season since 2007. Previous editions of the race have belonged to the USAC Stock Car division, the ASA National Tour and the CASCAR Super Series.

Previous winners

See also
Grand Prix of Mosport
Chevrolet Silverado 250
Mosport Can-Am
Mosport Trans-Am
Canadian Grand Prix
Canadian Motorcycle Grand Prix
Telegraph Trophy 200 / Molson Diamond Indy

External links 
Official Site
NASCAR Track Page

Footnotes 

NASCAR races at Canadian Tire Motorsport Park
Sport in Ontario
Clarington
Auto races in Canada
Tourist attractions in the Regional Municipality of Durham
1962 establishments in Ontario
Recurring sporting events established in 1962